Wolfgang Reitherman (June 26, 1909 – May 22, 1985), also known and sometimes credited as Woolie Reitherman, was a German–American animator, director and producer and one of the "Nine Old Men" of core animators at Walt Disney Productions. He emerged as a key figure at Disney during the 1960s and 1970s, a transitionary period which saw the death of Walt Disney in 1966, with him serving as director and/or producer on eight consecutive Disney animated feature films from One Hundred and One Dalmatians through The Fox and the Hound.

Career
While studying at Chouinard Art Institute, his paintings had attracted the attention of Philip L. Dike, a drawing and painting instructor. Impressed with his artwork, Dike showed them to Disney, in which Reitherman was invited to the studio. He initially wanted to work as a watercolorist, but Walt Disney suggested he should be an animator. Reitherman was hired at Walt Disney Productions on May 21, 1933, and his first project was working as an animator on the Silly Symphonies cartoon, Funny Little Bunnies (1933). Reitherman continued to work on a number of Disney shorts, including The Band Concert (1935), Music Land (1935), and Elmer Elephant (1936). He animated the Slave in the Magic Mirror in Snow White and the Seven Dwarfs (1937). His next assignments were animating Monstro in Pinocchio (1940), the climactic dinosaur fight in Igor Stravinsky's "Rite of Spring" segment of Fantasia (1940), and several scenes of Timothy Q. Mouse in Dumbo (1941).

In 1942, Reitherman had left the Disney studios to serve in World War II for the United States Army Air Forces, earning the Distinguished Flying Cross after serving in Africa, China, India, and the South Pacific. He was discharged in February 1946, having earned the rank of Major. Reitherman rejoined the studio in April 1947, where he animated the Headless Horseman chase in The Legend of Sleepy Hollow section in The Adventures of Ichabod and Mr. Toad (1949). 

Around this same time, he had claimed he was instrumental in helping Walt Disney commit to producing Cinderella (1950). Upon looking at rough storyboards, Reitherman recalled, "I just went in his office, which I rarely did, and I said, 'Gee, that looks great. We ought to do it.' It might have been a little nudge to say, 'Hey, let's get going again and let's do a feature'." On Cinderella (1950), he was the directing animator of the sequence in which Jaq and Gus laboriously push and pull the key up the stairs to Cinderella. On Alice in Wonderland (1951), he animated the scene in which the White Rabbit's home is destroyed by an enlarged Alice. On Peter Pan (1953), he animated the scene of Captain Hook attempting to escape the crocodile. For Lady and the Tramp (1955), Reitherman animated the alley dog fight sequence and Tramp's fight with the rat in the nursery room. 

During the late 1950s, Reitherman served as the sequence director of Prince Phillip's climactic fight against Maleficent as a dragon in Sleeping Beauty (1959). He next directed the "Twilight Bark" sequence for One Hundred and One Dalmatians (1961). Beginning with The Sword in the Stone (1963), he became the first sole director of a Disney animated feature, which was in direct contrast to having several directors over an animated feature. Animator Ward Kimball had claimed it was because Reitherman's work compatibility and willingness to accept any project "with a smile". Animator Bob Carlson stated Disney had trusted Reitherman's decision-making before he would embark on a film project. He would continue to direct The Jungle Book (1967), The Aristocats (1970), Robin Hood (1973), and The Rescuers (1977). Additionally, he would direct several animated shorts such as Goliath II (1960) and the first two Winnie the Pooh shorts, Winnie the Pooh and the Honey Tree (1966) and Winnie the Pooh and the Blustery Day (1968), which won the Academy Award for Best Animated Short Film. 

While directing The Jungle Book (1967), Reitherman followed the procedure to keep production costs low, in which he recalled Disney advising him to "keep the costs down because [feature cartoons are] going to price themselves out of business." During his tenure, he allowed for "recycled" or limited animation from prior animated films to be used. It had been presumed because it was done to save on time and production costs, though it was in fact more labor-intensive. Floyd Norman, an animator who had worked under Reitherman, explained it was actually easier and less time-consuming for character animators to create original drawings. Nevertheless, Reitherman's use of recycling animation proved to be controversial within the studio, as animator Milt Kahl despised the method: "I detest the use of—it just breaks my heart to see animation from Snow White used in The Rescuers. It kills me, and it just embarrasses me to tears." Despite the similarities in technique, this is not the same animation process of rotoscoping.

Following The Rescuers (1977), he was initially slated to direct The Fox and the Hound (1981), but following creative conflicts with co-director Art Stevens, he was taken off the project. Reitherman later moved on to several undeveloped animation projects such as Catfish Bend based on the book series by Ben Lucien Burman, and Musicana, a follow-up project to Fantasia (1940) in which he co-developed with artist Mel Shaw. In 1980, he developed an adaptation of the children's novel The Little Broomstick by Mary Stewart, but work was discontinued due to the studio's desire for ambitious films such as The Black Cauldron (1985). In the following year, he retired.

Personal life and death
Born in Munich, German Empire, Reitherman's family moved to America when he was a child. After attending Pasadena Junior College and briefly working as a draftsman for Douglas Aircraft, Reitherman returned to school at the Chouinard Art Institute, graduating in 1933.

Following his discharge from the Air Force, he married Janie Marie McMillan in November 1946. All three of Reitherman's sons—Bruce, Richard and Robert—provided voices for Disney characters, including Mowgli in The Jungle Book, Christopher Robin in Winnie the Pooh and the Honey Tree, and Wart in The Sword in the Stone.

Reitherman died in a single-car accident near his Burbank, California home on May 22, 1985. He was posthumously named a Disney Legend in 1989.

Filmography

References

Bibliography

External links
 

1909 births
1985 deaths
Accidental deaths in California
American animated film directors
American animated film producers
American animators
American film directors
American film producers
Chouinard Art Institute alumni
Directors of Best Animated Short Academy Award winners
Fantasy film directors
German emigrants to the United States
Recipients of the Distinguished Flying Cross (United States)
Road incident deaths in California
Walt Disney Animation Studios people